Pape Gassama (born 1 September 1996) is a Senegalese professional footballer who plays as a forward.

Career
On 21 August 2019, Gassama joined Belgian club Royal Cappellen.

References

Senegalese footballers
Senegalese expatriate footballers
1996 births
Living people
Ligue 2 players
Championnat National players
Championnat National 3 players
US Créteil-Lusitanos players
SIMA Águilas players
Royal Cappellen F.C. players
Liga II players
AFC Turris-Oltul Turnu Măgurele players
Association football forwards
Senegalese expatriate sportspeople in France
Senegalese expatriate sportspeople in the United States
Senegalese expatriate sportspeople in Belgium
Senegalese expatriate sportspeople in Romania
Expatriate footballers in France
Expatriate soccer players in the United States
Expatriate footballers in Belgium
Expatriate footballers in Romania